Majungaeus is a genus of leaf beetles in the subfamily Eumolpinae. It is distributed in Madagascar.

Species
 Majungaeus coeruleus Bechyné, 1964
 Majungaeus fenerivensis Bechyné, 1964
 Majungaeus fulvitarsis (Jacoby, 1901)
 Majungaeus fulvitarsis fulvitarsis (Jacoby, 1901)
 Majungaeus fulvitarsis laetabilis Bechyné, 1949
 Majungaeus fulvitarsis reticulatus Bechyné, 1949
 Majungaeus lambomakandrensis Bechyné, 1964
 Majungaeus punctatosulcatus (Fairmaire, 1886)
 Majungaeus rubricollis Bechyné, 1949
 Majungaeus rufus (Brancsik, 1893)
 Majungaeus simplex Bechyné, 1964
 Majungaeus striatus (Harold, 1877)
 Majungaeus suturalis (Harold, 1877)
 Majungaeus unicolor (Jacoby, 1897)
 Majungaeus vittatus Bechyné, 1949

References

Eumolpinae
Chrysomelidae genera
Beetles of Africa
Insects of Madagascar
Endemic fauna of Madagascar